Gadebusch is a town in Mecklenburg-Western Pomerania in the district of Nordwestmecklenburg. Halfway between Lübeck, Schwerin and Wismar, it is part of the Hamburg Metropolitan Region.

The town is known for two notable monuments: the Stadtkirche (City Church), built in 1220, considered the oldest brick church in Mecklenburg, and the Schloss (Castle), built in 1580–1583 in Northern Renaissance style.

Near the town is the site of the Battle of Gadebusch in 1712.

Gadebusch municipality
Besides the old town of Gadebusch, the following settlements are incorporated with the Gadebusch municipality:

 Amtsbauhof
 An der Flöte
 Buchholz
 Dorf Ganzow
 Güstow
 Güstow Werder
 Hof Ganzow
 Jarmstorf
 Klein Hundorf
 Möllin
 Neu Bauhof
 Neu Güstow
 Reinhardtsdorf
 Stresdorf
 Wakenstädt

Education
Gymnasium Gadebusch (High School)

Notable people

 Theodor Körner (author) (1791-1813), writer and freedom fighter, fallen in a forestry at Rosenow 
 Agnes Karll (1868–1927), nursing reformer, is buried in the old Gadebuscher cemetery 
 Wolf Biermann (born 1936), German songwriter, from 1953 to 1955 he attended the school with boarding school.
 Joerg Stadler (born 1961), German actor, from 1975 to 1979 he attended the Oberschule

References

External links
Official Website (in German)

Cities and towns in Mecklenburg
Nordwestmecklenburg
Populated places established in the 13th century
1225 establishments in Europe
Grand Duchy of Mecklenburg-Schwerin